OnCore Golf Technology, Inc. is an American manufacturer of golf balls headquartered in Buffalo, New York.

History 
Founded in 2009 by Steve Coulton and Bret Blakely, the company is known for creating the first and only USGA-conforming hollow-metal-core ball in 2012. OnCore has since released several other golf ball products, including the ELIXR, VERO X1, and VERO X2 tour performance golf balls. OnCore has secured the sponsorship rights of the Gateway Tour. The company relies primarily on word-of-mouth marketing for advertising and conducts much of its sales online. Professional athletes such as Ezekiel Elliott and Josh Allen have become shareholders in the company.

In 2019, OnCore announced plans for a privately funded $30-million year-round sports entertainment complex along the Buffalo River on a former brownfield near Riverworks and Canalside. The facility will include a 72-hitting-bay golf entertainment center with food and beverages, 350 parking spaces, a 120-room hotel with meeting and event space, and year-round access to the river, in addition to attractions for children.

References

External links
 

Golf equipment manufacturers
Companies based in Buffalo, New York
Entertainment companies established in 2009